The 2019 Taça 12 de Novembro is the 7th staging of the Taça 12 de Novembro, the football knockout tournament in East Timor.

The draw was held on 12 April 2019.

Preliminary round

Round of 16

Quarter-finals

Semi-finals

Final

References

External links
Facebook page
RSSSF

Taça 12 de Novembro
Timor-Leste
2019 in Timor Leste football